The Kurwaldbahn is a funicular railway in the town of Bad Ems in the Rhineland-Palatinate, Germany. It links the city with a view point, complete with a Bismarckturm (Bismarck Tower), and lies opposite the closed  funicular on the other bank of the River Lahn.

The funicular was constructed in 1979 and reconditioned in 2005. It operates daily every few minutes between 06:15 and 22:30.

The funicular has the following technical parameters:

Length: 
Height: 
Maximum Steepness: 78%
Configuration: single track with passing loop
Cars: 2
Capacity: 25 passengers per car
Journey time: 70 seconds
Track gauge: 
Traction: Electricity

See also 
 List of funicular railways

References

External links 

Kurwaldbahn web page

Railway lines in Rhineland-Palatinate
Funicular railways in Germany
Metre gauge railways in Germany
Railway lines opened in 1979
1979 establishments in West Germany